Bang Kho Laem is one of the 50 districts (khet) of Bangkok, Thailand. The incumbent district officer is Samita Xanthavanij. The district is bounded by (clockwise from north) Sathon, Yannawa, and across the Chao Phraya River, Rat Burana, Thon Buri and Khlong San districts.

History
Bang Kho Laem was formerly a part of amphoe Ban Thawai in Phra Pradaeng Province.

Ban Thawai was later reassigned to Phra Nakhon Province, and renamed amphoe Yan Nawa. When Phra Nakhon and Thon Buri were combined into a single province in 1972, the names of administrative units in the newly combined capital were changed from amphoe and tambon to district (khet) and sub-district (khwaeng). Thus, amphoe Yan Nawa (อำเภอยานนาวา) became khet Yan Nawa (เขตยานนาวา).

Due to population increases, on 18 April 1989, Yan Nawa Branch 2 (Khwaeng Bang Kho Laem) was established as a second administrative unit within the Yan Nawa District, overseeing three sub-districts: Bang Kho Laem, Wat Phraya Krai, and Bang Khlo. It became a separate district on 9 November 1989, called Bang Kho Laem.

Within Soi Charoen Krung 103 is a Muslim community known as Suan Luang 1, that has been around for a long time. In the past, the waterway here was a large khlong (canal) with clean water and children could swim in it, and there is a ship passing by. It is now just a small waterway. Since 2013, it has been developed into a waterfront market. There are about 100 street food stalls, all of which are halal. Although some traders are non-Muslims.

Administration
The district is divided into three sub-districts (khwaeng).

Places
Important streets in the district include:
 Rama III Road
 Charoen Krung Road
 Charoen Rat Road
 Ratchadaphisek Road
 Mahaisawan Road
 Chan Road
 Sathu Pradit Road
 Si Rat Express Way

Secondary streets in the district include:
 Sut Prasoet Road
 Chalaem Nimit Road
 Charoen Krung 85 and Sut Prasoet 9 (Soi Ban Mai)
 Charoen Krung 107, Charoen Rat 7, and Charoen Rat 10 (Soi Pradu 1)
 Charoen Rat 5, Charoen Rat 5 Yaek 4, Charoen Rat 7 Yaek 7, and Charoen Rat 8 (Soi Yu Di)
 Chan 43 (Soi Wat Phai Ngoen)
 Sathu Pradit 12 (Soi Thawi Sit)
 Charoen Rat 7 Yaek 35 (Soi Rat Uthit 1)

Asiatique is a famous open-air night shopping mall in Bangkok.

Education
Shrewsbury International School is in the district.

Health 
Charoenkrung Pracharak Hospital, operated by Bangkok Metropolitan Administration is in the district.

References

External links

BMA website with tourist landmarks of Bang Kho Laem
Bang Kho Laem district office (Thai only)

 
Districts of Bangkok